The Sanremo Music Festival 1954 was the fourth annual Sanremo Music Festival, held at the Sanremo Casino in Sanremo, province of Imperia between 28 and 30 January 1954. The show was presented by television presenter Nunzio Filogamo.
 
According to the rules of this edition every song was performed in a double performance by a couple of singers or groups, with some artists performing multiple songs.

The winner of the Festival was "Tutte le mamme", performed by Giorgio Consolini and Gino Latilla.

Participants and results

References 

Sanremo Music Festival by year
1954 in Italian music
1954 in Italian television
1954 music festivals